PKO may refer to:

 PKO; rap group from San Antonio, Texas, 
 Peacekeeping organization;
 PKO Bank Polski (also PKO BP), the Polish bank Powszechna Kasa Oszczędności Bank Polski Spółka Akcyjna;
 Bank Pekao, the Polish bank Bank Polska Kasa Opieki Spółka Akcyjna;
 Protect Kahoolawe Ohana, a native Hawaiian activist organization;
 the IATA call letters for Parakou Airport in Benin.